Rune Slagstad (born 22 February 1945) is a Norwegian historian, philosopher, legal theorist, professor and journal editor. In addition to professional work, he has since the late 1960s contributed actively to public debate on a variety of issues from Norway.

Biography 

Slagstad was editor of Pax Publishing (1971–1978) and the Norwegian University Press (1986–1989). He has held tenured professorships both at the University of Oslo, the Norwegian Institute for Social Research and Oslo University College and headed The Research Council of Norway Program on Governance and Democracy ("LOS") (1990–1998).

He initiated and co-edited the encyclopedia PaxLeksikon (with i.a. Hans Fredrik Dahl and Jon Elster), co-edited  the leftist journal Kontrast, and was editor-in-chief of the intellectual journal Nytt Norsk Tidsskrift from 1984 through 2009. Among his significant publications are the books Constitutionalism and democracy (co-edited with Jon Elster), De nasjonale strateger (”National strategists”), Rettens ironi (”The Irony of Law”) and Sporten: en idéhistorisk studie (”Sports”), a study of sports from a cultural historical point of view.

Slagstad has been a member of the Norwegian Academy for Language and Literature (1996-), the Norwegian Academy of Science and Letters (2002-), and on the board of Morgenbladet (2003–2009) and The Danish-Norwegian Foundation (1998-). He was one of the founders of the Norwegian Socialist Left Party (est. 1975), in which he through the 1970s also held several leading positions.

From 2009 to 2013, Slagstad held a professorship at the Centre for the Study of Professions at Oslo University College. He is currently at The Institute for Social Research working on a study of Scandinavian social-democratic sittlichkeit.

Slagstad was born and raised in Bergen, but now lives in Oslo with his wife Anine Kierulf. He has three children.

He was named Norway's leading intellectual by the daily newspaper Dagbladet in 2005. In 1996 he received the Fritt Ord Honorary Award.

Musician
In 2006 he played flute in the church service for Jens Chr Hauge—a rendition of traditional folk tune "Jeg lagde mig saa sildig".

References

Bibliography
 2019 Spillet om Ullevål sykehus - et doldisbyråkratisk lærestykke, Pax, 
 2019 Carl Schmitt - Et antiliberalt tema med variasjoner, Pax, 
 2019 Hannah Arendt - Politikk i dystre tider, Pax, 
 2018 Da fjellet ble dannet, Dreyer, 
 2017 Banens beste, Pax,  
 2017 Lærdom som lidenskap, Fagbokforlaget, 
 2015 Tilløp til offentlighet, Pax/Manifest, 
 2012 Spadestikk, Fagbokforlaget, 
 2010 Elster og sirenenes sang Pax, 
 2008 (Sporten): en idéhistorisk studie Pax, 
 2005 Utvalgte polemikker 
 2001 Rettens ironi, 
 2000 Kunnskapens hus. Fra Hansteen til Hanseid,  (2. ed. 2006 )
 1998 De nasjonale strateger  (2. ed. 2001 )
 1988 Constitutionalism and democracy with Jon Elster 
 1987 Rett og politikk: et liberalt tema med variasjoner (2. ed) )
 1980 Positivisme og vitenskapsteori: et essay om den norske positivismestriden 1976 Positivisme, dialektikk, materialisme'' (ed.)

Sources 
 Registered publications in BIBSYS
 Registered publications in FRIDA

1945 births
Living people
Academic staff of the University of Oslo
Norwegian philosophers
Academic staff of Oslo University College
Members of the Norwegian Academy
Members of the Norwegian Academy of Science and Letters